Peter Sheridan (born 1952) is an Irish playwright, screenwriter and director. He lives in Dublin. His awards include the Rooney Prize for Irish Literature. In 1980 he was writer-in-residence in the Abbey Theatre, Dublin, and his short film, The Breakfast, won several European awards. He wrote the pilot episode of Fair City. He wrote and directed the film Borstal Boy,<ref>IMDB </ref> which was released in 2002. He is the brother of the film director Jim Sheridan.

In 2017, he also appeared as a contestant on the British game show Countdown.

Plays
  Diary of a Hunger Strike  Emigrants  Finders Keepers   No Entry   Children of Eve   Paint It Black   Shades of the Jelly Woman (Part One)   The Liberty Suit   The Rock and Roll Show  Women at Work  Are You Havin' a Laugh? Borstal Boy   Playwright: Frank McMahon  "Borstal Boy" was written by Brendan Behan

Novels Every Inch of Her (Big Fat Love) (2003 & 2004)

Memoirs44 (1999)Forty Seven Roses (2002)Break a Leg'' (2012)

References

Sources

1952 births
Living people
Irish dramatists and playwrights
Irish male dramatists and playwrights
Irish novelists
People from County Dublin
Irish male novelists